The Tay Viaduct, also known as the West Railway Bridge, is a single-track railway viaduct in Perth, Perth and Kinross, Scotland. It carries the Scottish Central Railway, via a pronounced curve, across the River Tay to and from Perth railway station,  to the west. Built in 1864, the work of London's Francis Freeman & Lee, it replaced an earlier double-track timber viaduct dating from 1849. The first pier of today's structure is for a double track, but the line is now single.

The viaduct has seven iron girder spans on the city side of the river, ten stone arches on Moncreiffe Island, and six iron girder spans to the east of Moncreiffe Island. The earlier bridge had 25 arches and an iron swing bridge.

The bridge has two spans across the Tay from Perth: the first is to Moncreiffe Island; the second is from Moncreiffe Island to Barnhill on the river's eastern banks.

It has a pedestrian walkway on the outer edge of its curve. The curve is less severe than its predecessor's was. The current structure has seventeen chains.

References

External links
Tay Viaduct – RailScot

Bridges in Perth, Scotland
Bridges completed in 1864
Viaducts in Scotland
Steel bridges
Railway bridges in Scotland